This is a list of programs currently and soon to be broadcast by Metro Channel. For the previous programs which are airing, see List of programs aired by Metro Channel.

Current shows on Metro Channel

Metro Channel Original Programming
 At The Table (Season 2) (formerly "Chasing Flavors"; 2017–present)
 Beached (2018–present)
 Casa Daza (Season 2) (2017–present)
 Driven (2018–present)
 In The Metro (2018–present)
 Metro Home (2018–present)
 Potluck (Season 2) (2021–present)
 Pia's Postcards (2018–present)

Programs broadcast on ABS-CBN (Kapamilya Channel)

Documentary
 G Diaries (2017–present)

Religious
 Kapamilya Daily Mass (2020–present)
 Kapamilya Sunday Mass (2020–present)
 Kapamilya Journeys of Hope (2020–present)

Programs broadcast on ANC
 Executive Class (2017–present)

Home & Living
 Best Houses Philippines
 Island Life
 Luxe Asia (Season 2)
 Luxury Homes Revealed
 SMDC The Good Home
 The Real Houses of...

Food & Travel
 Andy and Ben Eat Australia
 Booze Traveller
 Check-In
 Dreamcatchers
 Donal Skehan's Kitchen Hero
 Jamie Cooks Italy
 United Plates of America
 The Wine Show
 Tim's Table

Fashion & Style
 VideoFashion News

Entertainment & Glamour
 Hollywood News Feed

Movie Block
 Movie Nights on Metro

Variety
 ASAP Natin 'To
 Arts.21

Special Coverage

Starting 2015, the channel is the official  broadcaster for the following US and Latin American events (same day or within 48 hours of US and Latin America telecast):
 Primetime Emmy Awards (2014–present)
 Hollywood Christmas Parade (first cable channel to do so in the country, 2015–present)
 Miss International (2023–present)
 Binibining Pilipinas (2014–present)
 Miss Colombia (2023–present)
 Miss Universe (2015–present)
 Mexicana Universal (2023–present)
 Miss Universe Colombia (2023–present)
 Miss Universe Philippines (2023–present)
 Miss USA (2023–present)
 Miss Teen USA (2023–present)
 Miss Venezuela (2023–present)
 Premios TV y Novelas (2023–present)
 Premios Tu Mundo (2023-present)
 Tournament of Roses Parade (formerly of Studio 23 (now S+A) and aired in Filipino in 2009 on ABS-CBN and in 2018 on Jeepney TV, 2016–2017, 2019–present)
 Screen Actors Guild Awards (2016–present)

Metro Channel TV Specials
 ABS-CBN Ball (2019)
 Binibining Pilipinas (2014–present)
 Star Magic Ball (2016–2018)
 Pantawid ng Pag-ibig: At Home Together Concert (March 22, 2020) (together with ABS-CBN, S+A, ANC, DZMM Radyo Patrol 630, DZMM Teleradyo, Jeepney TV, Asianovela Channel, MOR Philippines, iWant, TFC, and Myx)

Creative Programs
Lists of television series by network